Isla is a municipality in Veracruz, Mexico. It is located in south zone of the State of Veracruz, about 370 km from state capital Xalapa. It has a surface of 714.80 km2.

Borders
The municipality of Isla is delimited to the north by the municipalities of Tlacotalpan and Santiago Tuxtla, to the east by Hueyapan de Ocampo and Juan Rodríguez Clara, to the south by Playa Vicente and to the west by José Azueta.

Products
It produces principally maize, beans, rice, watermelon and pineapple.

Events
In  Isla, in May takes place the celebration in honor to Sagrado Corazón, Patron of the town.

Weather
The weather in  Isla  is warm all year with rains in summer and autumn.

Etymology
In Spanish, the word "Isla" means " Island "

References

External links 

  Municipal Official webpage
  Municipal Official Information

Municipalities of Veracruz